Downsview Airport  was located in the North York district of Toronto, Ontario, Canada. An air field, then air force base, it had been a testing facility for Bombardier Aerospace from 1994 to 2018. Bombardier has sold the facility and manufacturing plant and its future is uncertain.

Downsview Airport had its own fire service (Bombardier Aerospace Emergency Services) which covers airport operations (using two airport fire rescue vehicles) and plant operations (using two SUV emergency vehicles). Bombardier Emergency Services employees were cross-trained as firefighters, first responders and airport security.

History

Downsview Airfield
Downsview Airfield opened in 1929 as general aviation airfield and one of two airports in the area. It was built by de Havilland Canada for testing aircraft at the plant at the site. The site was expanded during World War II by the Royal Canadian Air Force and renamed RCAF Station Downsview.

Downsview Airport
The Downsview Airport was developed in 1939 as an airfield next to an aircraft manufacturing plant operated by de Havilland Canada. In 1947, the Department of National Defence purchased property surrounding the airfield and expanded it, creating RCAF Station Downsview to provide an air base for Royal Canadian Air Force units. The base was renamed Canadian Forces Base Toronto (Downsview) in 1968 and retained this name until its closure in 1996.

From 1998, the property was administered by a civilian Crown corporation, Parc Downsview Park, which co-managed the airfield with Bombardier Aerospace (the successor to de Havilland Canada).

The airfield was used to host the 1984 and 2002 papal visits by Pope John Paul II, as well as to host the Molson Canadian Rocks for Toronto concert headlined by The Rolling Stones to revive the local economy after the severe acute respiratory syndrome (SARS) outbreak in 2003.

The airfield has also served as a test site for several famous aircraft produced by de Havilland and Avro Canada, including the Beaver, the Twin Otter, and the Dash 8. The airport is available to pilots only with prior permission.

Bombardier Aerospace currently owns 12 hangars in the southwest corner of the airport, where the Dash 8 was built and assembled. The Bombardier Global Express and the Bombardier Global 5000 are also assembled here at the Downsview plant, as are the wings and wingboxes of the Learjet 45. The Bombardier CSeries jet had landed at the airfield in 2015, but is assembled in Montreal.

Bombardier has an agreement to sell the Downsview Airport and its manufacturing plant to PSP Investments. Under the agreement, Bombardier can use Downsview for up to five years. Bombardier signed a lease agreement with the Greater Toronto Airports Authority to build a new facility at Pearson Airport on  where it would move the production of its Global series planes. Plans for Dash 8 production were not announced at that time. In November 2018, Bombardier sold the Dash 8 business and the DeHavilland name to Viking Air, which has not disclosed its long-term plans for Dash 8 production beyond the existing already agreed-upon timeframe for Downsview.

Farewell of De Havilland Canada

On June 11, 2022, a private event was held at Downsview Airport, marking the farewell of De Havilland Canada after being located at the airport for 94 years. Many of the past and present employees and their families were invited, and many de Havilland Canada aircraft were being showcased as well as arriving and departing from the airport.

Military housing
A series of homes were built for Canadian Forces personnel at the corner of Keele Street and Sheppard Avenue West and at the south end of the base property. Access to the north end housing on Robert Woodhead Crescent and John Drury Drive was restricted to base personnel and fenced off from the neighbouring properties. With most of the military base being closed down, the housing has been abandoned and torn down.

Tenants
 Parc Downsview Park – Government of Canada
 Bombardier Aerospace
 Tree City
 The Hangar Sports Complex
 Toronto Roller Derby
 The Toronto Wildlife Centre
 Toronto Football Club Training Facility and Academy
 Canadian Armed Forces
4th Canadian Division headquarters
 Area Support Unit Toronto (formerly Garrison Support Unit Toronto)
 Denison Armoury
 32 Canadian Brigade Group headquarters
 2 Intelligence Company
 32 Combat Engineer Regiment
 25 (Toronto) Service Battalion
 The Governor General's Horse Guards
 Toronto Transit Commission Wilson Subway Yard

Buildings located within or next to the airport:
 Bombardier Aerospace facility – southwest end of the airport
 CFB Downsview hangars – northeast end of the airport
 Farmers market – northwest end
 Downsview Park station – north end, combined subway/commuter train station

Former tenants
 Canadian Air and Space Museum, formerly the Toronto Aerospace Museum and before that the original factory for de Havilland Aircraft of Canada (until 2012)

Roads
Most of the roads at Downsview are city-owned roadways:
 John Drury Drive - portions are a private access road for Canadian Forces named for Sapper John Drury of the Canadian Engineers
 Yukon Lane
 Carl Hall Road - former section of Sheppard Avenue and named for Private Carl Hall, American born World War I member of the Central Ontario Regiment
 Canuck Avenue
 Hanover Road
 Beffort Road
 Robert Woodhead Crescent - private access road for Canadian Forces
 Garratt Blvd
 Plewes Road

Accidents and incidents
 February 14, 1956, a pre-delivery de Havilland U-1A Otter for the United States Army broke up mid-air and crashed near Downsview (on Keele Street), killing all five on board.

See also
 List of airports in the Greater Toronto Area

Notes

References
 Canadian Air & Space Museum
 Parc Downsview Park
 410 to 419 Squadrons
 Bruce Forsyth's Military History Page

Defunct airports in Ontario
Airports established in 1929
Airports disestablished in 2022
Transport in Toronto
Buildings and structures in Toronto
North York